The 2012 Victory Bowl was a college football bowl game played on November 17, 2012 at Francis Field in Greenville, Illinois. The Panthers won 28-27 in overtime. It was Greenville's first Victory Bowl win after three previous losses. It was Northwestern's sixth Victory Bowl appearance.

Game play

First quarter
The game was scoreless in the first period, with Northwestern punting three times and Greenville turning it over twice on downs.

Second quarter
Northwestern got the scoring started after a Greenville fumble early in the second quarter. Two plays later, Josh Balzer connected with Brian Lecheler for an 88-yard touchdown strike. The Eagles then capped a 66-yard drive with a two-yard TD pass from Balzer to Lecheler with 15 seconds remaining in the half for a 14-0 lead.

Third quarter
Greenville opened the second half with a scoring after Brendan Chambers ran nine yards for a touchdown after a 74-yard scoring drive. Following a Northwestern three-and-out, the Panthers had an 80-yard touchdown pass of their own as Chambers found Anthony Gonzalez to tie the game at 14. Both teams traded punts and fumbles for the rest of the quarter without any scoring.

Fourth quarter
After being pinned at their own 1-yard line, Greenville put together a 99-yard drive resulting a two-yard touchdown run by Justin Honeycutt for the Panthers' first lead of the game. Greenville threw an interception on its next drive, and Northwestern scored on the ensuing possession with a Tim Youtzy two-yard run with 4:10 left to tie the game at 21. Both teams threw interceptions late in the game, and Greenville missed a 27-yard field goal as time expired, sending the game to overtime.

Overtime
Greenville won the coin toss and elected to kick off. Youtzy capped an eight-play Northwestern drive with a one-yard TD run, but Ethan Zepp missed the ensuing PAT. Greenville took five plays to get into the end zone on its possession, with Chambers' three-yard touchdown tying the game. Frewin's point-after was successful to win the game for the Panthers, 28-27.

References 

Victory Bowl
Victory Bowl
Northwestern Eagles football bowl games
Greenville Panthers football bowl games
November 2012 sports events in the United States
Victory Bowl